The Jadar Museum is a history museum located in Loznica, Serbia. It has a permanent collection dedicated to man's activities in the area of Podrinje from prehistory until 1950. The museum is housed in the Old Pharmacy Building, which is the cultural monument of great importance.

History
The decision to create the museum was taken in 1984 by the Municipal assembly of Loznica, which decided on the building of "Old Pharmacy" to make it the city museum. The museum was opened on 14 September 1987 with a ceremony honoring two centuries of Vuk Stefanović Karadžić.

Exposition
Jadar Museum has a permanent collection dedicated to man's activities in the area of Loznica of prehistory until 1950.
The setting is enriched with years and now has 171 archaeological objects, 410 ethnological, historical 516, 195 numismatic and more than 1500 documents and photos.
In addition to the permanent exhibition at the Jadar Museum occasionally displayed temporary exhibitions, about 10 per year for 10 to 12 days.

Gallery

See also
 Loznica
 Vidin Grad
 Koviljkin grad
 Trojanov Grad
 Gensis (vicus)

References

External links
 

Museum in Loznica
Museums in Serbia
Museum in Loznica
Museums established in 1987
Museum in Loznica